Alexis de Chaunac (born 1991) is a Mexican-French contemporary artist. He is best known for his paintings and drawings, based on mythology, religion, literature, art history and politics.

Life and career
Alexis was born in New York City and grew up in Mexico City and Paris. His grandfather was a Mexican artist José Luis Cuevas, and his father Emmanuel de Chaunac was an executive director and deputy chairman of Christie’s. He graduated from Sarah Lawrence College and the University of Oxford.

Selected exhibitions

Selected solo exhibitions
 2019 - Botanica, Sargent’s Daughters, New York, NY
 2018 - Botanica Magnifica, chashama, New York, NY
 2017 - Rebelde con Causa, Universidad de Guanajuato, Mexico
 2015 - A Dance with Life and Death, Silas von Morisse Gallery, Brooklyn, NY
 2015 - Mala Sangre, Bestiario, Pinacoteca Diego Rivera, Xalapa, Mexico

Selected group exhibitions
 2020 - EXODUS III : Mexico In New York, WhiteBox Harlem, New York, NY
 2019 - Vertigo, Baahng & Co. Gallery, New York, NY
 2017 - 7102 Fantasma semiótico (s)cituacionista, Museo de Arte Carrillo Gil, Mexico

References

External links
 

1991 births
Living people
21st-century American male artists
American contemporary painters
21st-century American painters